Jiuli may refer to:

Jiuli District, a former administrative division in Xuzhou, Jiangsu, China, was disestablished in 2010
Guri,  city in Gyeonggi Province, South Korea
Jiuli Station, on Line 7 of the Dalian Metro